Alban Butler (13 October 171015 May 1773) was an English Roman Catholic priest and hagiographer.

Biography 
Alban Butler was born in 1710, at Appletree, Aston le Walls, Northamptonshire, the second son of Simon Butler, Esq. His father died when he was young and he was sent to the Lancashire boarding school ran by Dame Alice. He went on to a Catholic further education at the English College, Douai, in France. In 1735 Butler was ordained a priest. At Douai, he was appointed professor of philosophy, and later professor of theology. It was at Douai that he began his principal work The Lives of the Fathers, Martyrs and Other Principal Saints. He also prepared material for Richard Challoner's Memoirs of Missionary Priests, a work on the martyrs of the reign of Elizabeth.

In 1745, Butler came to the attention of the Duke of Cumberland, younger son of King George II, for his devotion to the wounded English soldiers during the defeat at the Battle of Fontenoy.

Around 1746, Butler served as tutor and guide on the Grand Tour to James and Thomas Talbot, nephews of Gilbert Talbot, 13th Earl of Shrewsbury.  Their elder brother, George, succeeded their uncle as 14th Earl of Shrewsbury. Both James and Thomas Talbot later became Catholic bishops.

He laboured for some time as a missionary priest in Staffordshire, and was finally appointed president of the English seminary at Saint Omer in France, where he remained until his death.

Butler returned to England in 1749 and was made chaplain to the Duke of Norfolk, whose nephew and heir, the Hon. Edward Howard, Butler accompanied to Paris as tutor. While he was in Paris, Butler completed his Lives. During his term as President of the English seminary, Butler also served the bishops of Arras, Saint-Omer, Ypres, and Boulogne-Sur-Mer as their Vicar-General. Butler died in Saint-Omer in 1773 and was buried in the parish church of Saint-Denis.

See An Account of the Life of A. B. by C. B., i.e. by his nephew Charles Butler (London, 1799); and Joseph Gillow's Bibliographical Dictionary of English Catholics, vol. i.

The Lives of Saints 

Butler's great work, The Lives of the Fathers, Martyrs, and Other Principal Saints ("Butler's Lives"), the result of thirty years' study, was first published in four volumes in London, 1756–1759. It is a popular and compendious reproduction of the Acta Sanctorum, exhibiting great industry and research, and is in all respects the best compendium of Acta in English. Butler's magnum opus has passed many editions and translations.

The first edition (1756–1759) 
This edition was printed initially in 4 octavo volumes, with no stated publisher or author's name. However they were so thick that they were usually bound in more volumes. There were actually 6 title pages since Vol. 3 and Vol. 4 both have a "part 2" issued thus: vol. 1, vol. 2, vol. 3, vol. 3 part 2, vol. 4, and vol. 4 part 2. Each "volume" contained three months of the liturgical calendar's Saints' lives. Vol. 1 also had a copperplate engraving with figures of the Roman devices of torture used, and a 2-page explanation of their use.

Charles Butler's assertion that "all the notes" were left out of the first edition at the suggestion of Bishop Challoner is exaggerated. There are many useful, and even extended, notes in the first edition, but not to the extent that they appear in the second, and succeeding editions. According to Charles Knight, the 1847 edition published in twelve volumes is considered the best and most complete.

Modern editions
Since Fr. Butler published his original edition of his Lives, many successors have revised and updated the work. Father Herbert Thurston, SJ, edited and significantly rewrote the work; his 12-volume "Revised Edition" was published between 1926 and 1938.

References

External links 
 
 
 
 "The Lives of the Fathers, Martyrs, and Other Principal Saints", Complete text of the 12 vol. ed. of 1866 at Bartleby.com
Alban Butler letter from Saint-Omer, France, 1770 at Pitts Theology Library, Candler School of Theology
 One modern abridged Concise Edition is: 

1710 births
1773 deaths
English College, Douai alumni
People from West Northamptonshire District
Christian hagiographers
18th-century English Roman Catholic priests